Saara Kuugongelwa-Amadhila (born 12 October 1967) is the current Prime Minister of Namibia, in office since 21 March 2015. Kuugongelwa-Amadhila is a member of the South West Africa People's Organization (SWAPO). She has been a member of the National Assembly of Namibia since 1995 and served as Minister of Finance from 2003 to 2015. She is the first woman to serve as Prime Minister of Namibia. Saara is a Hon. Doctorate in Public Finance; MSC in Financial Economics. Economist at Office of the President 1995 -1995; Director General of National Planning Commission 1995 -2003; Minister of Finance 2003-2015; Prime Minister of Namibia 2015 -Present.

Early life and education
Saara Kuugongelwa was born on 12 October 1967 in Otamanzi, South West Africa (present day Namibia). She went into exile with SWAPO in 1980 at the age of 13 and left for Sierra Leone in 1982 at the age of 15. She attended Koidu Girls Secondary School from 1982 to 1984 and Saint Joseph's Secondary School from 1984 to 1987. From 1991 to 1994, she attended Lincoln University in Pennsylvania, United States, where she graduated with a MSc in financial economics.

Political career
Kuugongelwa-Amadhila returned to Namibia following her graduation from Lincoln University and took a position as economist in the Office of the President under Sam Nujoma. In 1995, after only a few months in the job, Nujoma appointed her to parliament at the age of 27, and made her director general of the National Planning Commission, a position in the rank of a minister. In 2003 Nujoma promoted her to Minister of Finance.

Alongside President Hage Geingob, she was sworn in as the 4th Prime Minister of Namibia on 21 March 2015. She is the first woman to hold the position.

In May 2016, she took part in "A Conversation with The Right Honourable Saara Kuugongelwa-Amadhila, Prime Minister of the Republic of Namibia," a moderated discussion with Wilson Center's Women in Public Service Project, the Wilson Center Africa Program, and the Constituency for Africa. She has spoken about gender equality on numerous occasions, including during the Mali Prime Minister Modibo Keita's visit and in a speech (read by Christine Hoebes on her behalf) at the 10th Namibian Women's Summit where she stated that it would take 70 years to close the gender pay gap across Africa.

Personal life
Kuugongelwa is married to businessman Onesmus Tobias Amadhila.

Awards and recognition
On Heroes' Day 2014, she was conferred the Most Brilliant Order of the Sun, Second Class.

References

1967 births
Living people
21st-century Namibian women politicians
21st-century Namibian politicians
Lincoln University (Pennsylvania) alumni
Members of the National Assembly (Namibia)
Women government ministers of Namibia
Government ministers of Namibia
People from Omusati Region
Prime Ministers of Namibia
Finance ministers of Namibia
SWAPO politicians
Women prime ministers
Women members of the National Assembly (Namibia)
Female finance ministers
Women economists
Directors-general of the National Planning Commission of Namibia